Victor Suppantschitsch (1838-1919) was an Austrian lawyer and philatelist. He retired in 1906 as president of the Senate of the Supreme Court of Cassation. In 2021 he was retrospectively named as one of the fathers of philately.

Selected publications 
 Leitfaden der Philatelie, Leipzig, Ed. Wartig's Verlag, 1880.
 Bibliographie, zugleich Nachschlagebuch der gesamten deutschen philatelistischen Literatur seit ihrem Entstehen bis Ende 1891, Verlag A. Larisch, 1892.
 Grundzüge der Briefmarkenkunde und des Briefmarkensammelns, 1895.
 Die Entstehung und Entwicklung der philatelistischen Literatur in der zweiten Hälfte des XIX. Jahrhunderts, Selbstverlag Wien, 1901.

References 

1838 births
1919 deaths
Austrian philatelists
19th-century Austrian lawyers
20th-century Austrian judges
Philatelic authors
German-language writers